Kwun Tong Swimming Pool is a public swimming pool in Kwun Tong, Kowloon, Hong Kong and is the largest swimming pool complex in Kwun Tong District. It is located south of Tsui Ping Estate and is close to Kwun Tong and Lam Tin stations. Currently, it is managed by the Leisure and Cultural Services Department of Hong Kong Government. Covering an area of about 23,038 m2, there are multiple outdoor indoor swimming pool facilities, which provide residents in the district with all-day indoor and outdoor swimming venues. It is also a popular choice for residents of East Kowloon to learn to swim.

History
The old Kwun Tong Swimming Pool, built and originally managed by the Urban Council, opened on 25 July 1971. The Royal Hong Kong Jockey Club donated HK$5,410,000 toward the construction of the swimming complex, which was located immediately north of the current pool. It was formally opened on 30 October 1971 by Princess Anne.

In 2000, the Urban Council was disbanded by the government, and management of the swimming pool became the responsibility of the newly formed Leisure and Cultural Services Department (LCSD).

The government proposed in 2002 to build the Kwun Tong Town Hall and rebuild the Kwun Tong Swimming Pool on the original swimming pool site, but this plan was shelved in 2006.

The Leisure and Cultural Services Department applied for funding in 2009 to build a new Kwun Tong swimming pool on the old site of the Kwun Tong Recreation Ground Football Field, which was constructed by Gammon Construction and was opened on 1 April 2013. It was officially opened by the late Florence Hui on 26 October 2013.

Facilities

Indoor facilities
 Main pool
 Training pool
 Spectator stand (1,492 seats)
 Electronic scoreboard
 Family changing room

Outdoor facilities
 Secondary pool
 Two teaching pools
 Sun bathing area

References

External links

1971 establishments in Hong Kong
Swimming venues in Hong Kong
Kwun Tong